Namibia Breweries Limited (NBL) is a Namibian brewery which is based in Windhoek, Namibia. It was founded in 1920.

History
The brewery was founded in 1920 when Carl List and Hermann Ohlthaver acquired four small breweries with financial difficulties. The breweries were merged under the name South West Breweries Limited (SWB).  

In March 1990, SWB changed its name to Namibia Breweries Limited when Namibia gained independence. Ohlthaver & List Group of Companies are still the majority shareholder.

Since 2003, Namibia Breweries Limited has been working in partnership with Heineken South Africa. After 2010, NBL started to buy shares of Heineken SA, eventually reaching a 25% ownership of the Dutch subsidiary in South Africa.

In 2014, Namibian Breweries Limited became the first brewer in Africa to switch to solar energy, and on a large scale. It invested in a 1.MW Solar Power plant installed on existing roof structures and covering up to 34% of its energy use.

In November 2021, Heineken N.V. acquired the brewery along with Distell Group Holdings for $4.6 billion. At the time acquisition, the brewery was valued at 400 million euros.

Description
NBL brew all of their beers according to the Reinheitsgebot (German purity law) from 1516. Other than the four top-selling beers NBL also produces some speciality beers like Urbock - a winter bock beer. Nambrew also distributes other beer brands like Erdinger Weissbeer, Guinness and Kilkenny in the region. The low alcohol (2%), low calorie product Windhoek Light was endorsed by the South African Heart Foundation.

Currently NBL exports 20.5% of its production to South Africa and 22 other countries world-wide.

Products

Own products:
 Club Shandy
 Tafel Lager
 Tafel Lite
 Tafel Radler
 Camelthorn 
 King Lager
 Hansa Draught
 Windhoek Draught
 Windhoek Lager
 Windhoek Light
 Windhoek Non-alcoholic 
 McKane: Soda Water, Tonic Water, Lemonade, Dry Lemon and Cranberry 
 Vigo (malt soft drink): Marula, Wild Orange and Kiwano
 AquaSplash
Brewed under licence:
 Amstel Lager
 Amstel Lite
 Heineken
 Horizon 
 Strongbow

Distribute:
 Guinness
 Erdinger
 Erdinger Non-alcoholic 
 Foundry Cider
 Archers Aqua (various flavours)

Bibliography

References

External links

 

 
Breweries of Africa
Buildings and structures in Windhoek
Food and drink companies of Namibia
Companies based in Windhoek
Food and drink companies established in 1920
Namibian brands
Diageo
2021 mergers and acquisitions